The Wakestock Action Sports and Music Festival is a wakeboarding contest and Canada's largest action sports and music festival. It is held in Ontario, Canada on the Toronto Islands, Toronto, Ontario. The name Wakestock refers to the famous outdoor music festival Woodstock.

History
Wakestock was born out of Bala, Ontario.

In 2005, the festival was moved to Toronto Islands from August 11–14. Each year the wakeboard competition is accompanied by a music festival. There are several stages with different bands playing throughout day.

There are also other attractions—in 2005 there was a skatepark set up for anyone with a skateboard. There was a Pro Freestyle motocross demonstration as well as a rail competition set up for wakeboarders. There are also separate designated alcohol serving areas because the entire festival is for all ages.

Wakestock 2015 was canceled and 2016 never got beyond planning stages.

Move to Collingwood
On August 9, 2009, Wakestock moved to Collingwood.

2007: Wakestock 10
The Toronto wakeboarding festival celebrated ten years in 2007 with a  Oakley Pool (designed py Pat Panakos), as well as a music festival featuring the Deftones, Goldfinger, De La Soul, Story of the Year, and Lupe Fiasco on the Telus main stage.

The winners of Wakestock 10 were as follows:

Malibu Boats Pro Expression Session: Men
1st) Phillip Soven 
2nd) Andrew Adikinson 
3rd) Jeff Weatherall

Malibu Boats Pro Expression Session: Women  
1st) Amber Wing
2nd) Sunni-Anne Ball 
3rd) Barrett Pearlman

Billabong Pro Railslide
1st) Keith Lidberg
2nd) Aaron Rathy
3rd) Kevin Henshaw

Oakley Pool Jam: Best Trick
Shane Bonifay

See also 
 Wakestock (Wales)

Music festivals in Toronto
Rock festivals in Canada
Wakeboarding
Water sports in Canada
Water sports competitions
Music festivals established in 2005